San Rafael is a canton in the Heredia province of Costa Rica. The head city is in San Rafael district.

History 
San Rafael was created on 28 May 1885 by decree 10.

Geography 
San Rafael has an area of  km² and a mean elevation of  metres.

The canton is northeast of the provincial capital city of Heredia, reaching from the suburbs high into the Cordillera Central (Central Mountain Range).

Districts 
The canton of San Rafael is subdivided into the following districts:
 San Rafael
 San Josecito
 Santiago
 Ángeles
 Concepción

Demographics 

For the 2011 census, San Rafael had a population of  inhabitants.

Transportation

Road transportation 
The canton is covered by the following road routes:

References 

Cantons of Heredia Province
Populated places in Heredia Province
Populated places established in 1885